Henry Broughton Parkinson (29 September 1884 – 19 August 1970) was a British film pioneer. He produced 85 films between 1918 and 1930 and directed more than 30 titles between 1920 and 1927.

Selected filmography
 Rock of Ages (1918)
 Darby and Joan (1920)
 Calvary (1920)
 The Law Divine (1920)
 The Marriage Lines (1921)
 Macbeth (1922)
 Married to a Mormon (1922)
 Trapped by the Mormons (1922)
 A Tale of Two Cities (1922)
 The Second Mate (1928)
 The Streets of London (1929)
 The Lure of the Atlantic (1929)

References

External links

1884 births
1970 deaths
British film directors
British film producers
People from Blackburn